Bird in a Cage is a 1986 American comedic drama film written and directed by Antonio Zarro while he was attending the Christian Broadcasting Network University (now Regent University).

Production
Zarro's original script for the film had the two leads dying, but this was changed when CBN University associate professor and executive producer of the film Terry Lindvall felt "so many deaths would make the movie too much like a Shakespearean tragedy."  He also recounted how a "blue tint applied at the film lab to turn a swimming scene from day to night made the heroine's pink bathing suit seem to disappear", which compelled Lindvall to censor most of the swimming shot." Lead actor Timothy Wright also noted that the unexpected outcome resulting from the main character's ambiguous prayer added a powerful and deeply moving  experience to the story.

Premise
The film follows a thief into the countryside where he is mistaken as preacher, which is transformational.

Reception
Hal Erickson of All Movie Guide remarked that the director was a college student when he "lovingly assembled" the film, writing "The material is simple (and sometimes simplistic), but demands artistry. Novice filmmaker Antonio Zarro delivered that artistry."

Accolades
 1987, won Academy of Motion Picture Arts and Sciences Student Academy Award in 1987

References

External links 
 

1986 films
American student films
American drama films
1980s English-language films
1980s American films